The Khabarovsk war crimes trials were the Soviet hearings of twelve Japanese Kwantung Army officers and medical staff charged with the manufacture and use of biological weapons, and human experimentation, during World War II. The war crimes trials were held between 25 and 31 December 1949 in the Soviet industrial city of Khabarovsk (Хабаровск), the largest in the Russian Far East. 

All twelve defendants pleaded guilty and were sentenced to prison terms ranging from two to twenty-five years, to be served in Siberian labour camps. In 1956, those still serving their sentences were released and repatriated to Japan.

It is speculated that the Soviets cut deals with Unit 731 in exchange for their research. However, instead of giving the suspects complete immunity, the Soviets instead traded the research for lenient sentences.

History
During the trials, the accused, including Major General Kiyoshi Kawashima, testified that as early as 1941, some 40 members of Unit 731 air-dropped plague-contaminated fleas on Changde, China, causing epidemic plague outbreaks.

Judges found all twelve accused war criminals guilty, sentencing them to terms ranging from two to twenty-five years in labour camps. In 1956, those still serving their sentences were released and repatriated to Japan.

In 1950, the Soviet Union published official trial materials in English, titled Materials on the Trial of Former Servicemen of the Japanese Army Charged with Manufacturing and Employing Bacteriological Weapons. These included documents from the preliminary investigation (the indictment, some of the documentary evidence, and some interrogation records), testimony from both the accused and witnesses, final pleas of the accused, some expert findings, and speeches from the state prosecutor and defense counsel, verbatim.

Published by state-run Foreign Languages Publishing House, the Soviet publication has long been out of print. But in November 2015, Google Books determined it was now in the public domain and published a facsimile of it online, also offering it for sale as an ebook.

Trial controversies
Speaking to the overall judicial integrity of the proceedings, bioethics expert Jing-Bao Nie said the following:

Despite its strong ideological tone and many obvious shortcomings such as the lack of international participation, the trial established beyond reasonable doubt that the Japanese army had prepared and deployed bacteriological weapons and that Japanese researchers had conducted cruel experiments on living human beings. However, the trial, together with the evidence presented to the court and its major findings—which have proved remarkably accurate—was dismissed as communist propaganda and totally ignored in the West until the 1980s.

Historian Sheldon Harris described the trial in his history of Unit 731:

Evidence introduced during the hearings was based on eighteen volumes of interrogations and documentary material gathered in investigations over the previous four years. Some of the volumes included more than four hundred pages of depositions.... Unlike the Moscow Show Trials of the 1930s, the Japanese confessions made in the Khabarovsk trial were based on fact and not the fantasy of their handlers.

Yet the very wealth of trial documentation that tended to confirm that the Khabarovsk proceedings were no mere show trial also led Harris to question the relatively light punishment meted out there. All of defendants (aside from one who died in prison and another who committed suicide) had been freed by 1956, a mere seven years after the trial took place. Chief trial translator Georgy Permyakov alleged that Soviet leader Joseph Stalin may have initially feared that Japan would execute Soviet prisoners of war if the Khabarovsk defendants were hanged. But Harris also claimed that "the Soviets made a deal with the Japanese similar to the one completed by the Americans: Information [in exchange] for... extremely light sentences":The Soviets and their successors never released the interrogation reports of the Japanese, some 18 volumes. This leads me to believe that the Japanese did arrange a deal, did yield some information, and the Soviets settled for the best goodies they could get.Harris also noted other controversies unleashed by the trial, which linked Emperor Hirohito to the Japanese biological warfare program, as well as allegations that Japanese biological warfare experiments had also been conducted on Allied prisoners of war.

One of the experts called upon by Soviet prosecutors during the trial, N. N. Zhukov-Verezhnikov, later served on the panel of scientists, led by Joseph Needham, investigating Chinese and North Korean allegations of US biological warfare in the Korean War.

Accused and their sentences 
25 years imprisonment:
General Otozō Yamada (born 1881), former Commander-in-Chief of the Kwantung Army (released from prison in 1956)
Lieutenant General Kajitsuka Ryuji (born 1888), former Chief of Medical Administration (released from prison in 1956)
Lieutenant General Takahashi Takaatsu (born 1888), former Chief of Veterinary Service (died in prison in 1951)
Major General Kawashima Kiyoshi (born 1893), former Chief of Unit 731 (released from prison in 1956)
20 years imprisonment:
Major General Sato Shunji (born 1896), former Chief of Medical Service, 5th Army (released from prison in 1956)
Major Karasawa Tomio (born 1911), former chief of a section of Unit 731 (killed himself in prison in 1956)
18 years imprisonment:
Lieutenant Colonel Nishi Toshihide (born 1904), former chief of a division of Unit 731 (released from prison in 1956)
15 years imprisonment:
Senior Sergeant Mitomo Kazuo (born 1924), former member of Unit 100 (released from prison in 1956)
12 years imprisonment:
Major Onoue Masao (born 1910), former chief of a branch of Unit 731 (released from prison in 1956)
10 years imprisonment:
Lieutenant Hirazakura Zensaku (born 1916), former researcher of Unit 100 (released from prison in 1956)
3 years imprisonment:
Kurushima Yuji (born 1923), former lab orderly of Branch 162 of Unit 731 (released in 1952)
2 years imprisonment:
Corporal Kikuchi Norimitsu (born 1922), former medical orderly of Branch 643 of Unit 731 (released in 1951)

See also 
Japanese war crimes
International Military Tribunal for the Far East
Military history of the Soviet Union

Notes

References 
Boris G. Yudin, Research on humans at the Khabarovsk War Crimes Trial, in: Japan's Wartime Medical Atrocities: Comparative Inquiries in Science, History, and Ethics (Asia's Transformations), Jing Bao Nie, Nanyan Guo, Mark Selden, Arthur Kleinman (Editors); Routledge, 2010, 
 Materials on the Trial of Former Servicemen of the Japanese Army Charged with Manufacturing and Employing Bacteriological Weapons, Foreign Languages Publishing House, 1950, 535 pp. (No ISBN number)

Biological warfare
Military history of the Soviet Union
War crimes trials in the Soviet Union
Japan–Soviet Union relations
1949 in the Soviet Union
World War II war crimes trials
Trials in Russia
Japanese biological weapons program
Khabarovsk